London Lamar (born December 29, 1990) is an American politician. She is a member of the Democratic Party and a member of the Tennessee Senate representing district 33 since 2022. She was previously a member of the Tennessee House of Representatives from 2018 to 2022 representing District 91. During her time there, she was the youngest Tennessee State Representative in office. She was appointed to the Tennessee Senate in March 2022 by the Shelby County Commission after fellow Democrat Katrina Robinson was expelled due to her indictment on charges of wire fraud. Lamar was sworn in on March 8, 2022, and effectively resigned her house seat.

Education 
Born and raised in Memphis, Tennessee, Lamar graduated in 2013 with her B.A. in Political Science from Saint Mary's College in Notre Dame, Indiana. She minored in Sociology and Intercultural Studies.

2018 election 

Lamar defeated Doris DeBerry-Bradshaw and Juliette Eskridge in the 2018 Democratic primary. Lamar faced no opposition in the November general election.

Career 
Lamar is currently the senator of District 33 in Shelby County, Tennessee after serving as the representative for District 91. She is also the president of Tennessee Young Democrats, a member of The National Organization of Black Elected Legislative Women (NOBEL Women), and a member of National Black Caucus of State Legislators. She was honored Memphis Flyer Top 20 under 30 Class of 2015 and Memphis Top 40 under 40 Class of 2017. She has sponsored 16 bills, co-sponsored 48, and co-sponsored 65 resolutions. According to her website, Lamar has a particularly strong focus on education, families, and communities.

Committees 
Lamar serves as a member of the Judiciary Committee and the Energy, Agriculture and Natural Resources Committee. During her time in the state House of Representatives, she served as a member of the Local Committee, the Cities & Counties Subcommittee, the Transportation Committee, and the Safety & Funding Subcommittee.

References 

Living people
Democratic Party Tennessee state senators
Saint Mary's College (Indiana) alumni
1990 births
Politicians from Memphis, Tennessee
Women state legislators in Tennessee
African-American state legislators in Tennessee
African-American women in politics
21st-century American politicians
21st-century American women politicians
21st-century African-American women
21st-century African-American politicians